Arthur Michael "Art" Wolfe (29 April 1939 – 17 February 2014) was an American astrophysicist, professor and the former Director of the Center for Astrophysics & Space Sciences at the University of California, San Diego. Together with Rainer K. Sachs, he authored the paper describing the Sachs-Wolfe effect.

The disc galaxy DLA0817g is nicknamed the Wolfe Disc in his honor.

References

External links
 Center for Astrophysics & Space Sciences
 UCSD obituary

1939 births
2014 deaths
20th-century American astronomers
20th-century American physicists
21st-century American astronomers
21st-century American physicists
University of California, San Diego faculty